Sevastopol is a port city in Crimea.

Sevastopol may also refer to:

Places
 Sevastopol, Indiana, an unincorporated community in the US
 Sevastopol, Wisconsin, a town in the US
 2121 Sevastopol, a main-belt binary asteroid discovered in 1971

Ships
 Russian ironclad Sevastopol, an armored frigate that was converted to an ironclad while under construction
 Russian battleship Sevastopol (1895), a Petropavlovsk-class pre-dreadnought battleship scuttled during the Russo-Japanese War of 1904–1905
 Russian battleship Sevastopol (1911), a Gangut-class battleship that participated in World War I and World War II before she was scrapped in 1949
 Russian battlecruiser Sevastopol (1939), a Soviet Kronshtadt-class battlecruiser that was never completed
 Russian amphibious assault ship Sevastopol, a Mistral-class amphibious assault ship, ultimately sold instead to Egypt in 2016 as ENS Anwar El Sadat

Other uses
 Sevastopol: On Photographs of War, a book of poems by American William Allen
 Sevastopol Sketches or Sevastopol, a book by Leo Tolstoy
 "Sevastopol", a 2011 song by Moby from Destroyed
 "Sevastopol", a 2010 song by Heaven Shall Burn from Invictus (Iconoclast III)
 Sevastopol, a fictional space station in the 2014 video game Alien: Isolation

See also
 Battle for Sevastopol, a 2015 Ukrainian-Russian film about Lyudmila Pavlichenko
 Defence of Sevastopol, a 1911 Russian film about the Siege of Sevastopol
 Russian ship Sevastopol, a list of Russian naval warships
 Sebastopol (disambiguation)
 Sevastopolsky (disambiguation)
 Siege of Sevastopol (disambiguation)